RKVV STEVO is a football club from Geesteren, Netherlands. RKVV STEVO plays in the 2017–18 Sunday Eerste Klasse E.

From 1990 up to 2003 RKVV STEVO played continuously in the Hoofdklasse, at that time the highest amateur league. In 1994 they became Sunday amateur champions.

References

External links
 Official site

Football clubs in the Netherlands
Football clubs in Overijssel
Sport in Tubbergen
Association football clubs established in 1933
1933 establishments in the Netherlands